Max Lerner (December 20, 1902 – June 5, 1992) was a Russian Empire-born American journalist and educator known for his controversial syndicated column.

Background

Maxwell Alan Lerner was born on December 20, 1902, in Minsk, in the Russian Empire, the son of Bessie (Podel) and Benjamin Lerner. His Russian-Jewish family emigrated to the U.S. in 1907, where his father sold milk door to door. Lerner earned a B.A. from Yale University in 1923. He studied law there, but transferred to Washington University in St. Louis for an M.A. in 1925. He earned a PhD from Robert Brookings Graduate School of Economics and Government, Washington, D.C., in 1927.

Career

Once out of school, Lerner began work as an editor for the Encyclopaedia of the Social Sciences (1927–32), The Nation (1936–38), and PM (1943–48).  After PM sold, he continued as a contributor to its short-lived successor, the New York Star (ended 1949).

His column for the New York Post debuted in 1949. It earned him a place on the master list of Nixon political opponents. During most of his career he was considered a liberal. In his later years, however, he was seen as something of a conservative since he expressed support for Margaret Thatcher and the Reagan administration.

He taught at Sarah Lawrence College, Harvard University, Williams College, United States International University, the University of Notre Dame, and Brandeis University. Lerner was also a close friend of film star Elizabeth Taylor during her marriage to Eddie Fisher.

Personal life and death

Lerner was a strong advocate of the New Deal.

Lerner was a staunch opponent of discrimination against African Americans but supported the wartime Japanese American internment and backed an American Civil Liberties Union resolution on the issue to "subordinate civil liberties to wartime considerations and political loyalties."

Lerner married Anita Marburg in 1928, and they divorced in 1940. He married Edna Albers in 1941. Lerner died on June 5, 1992.

Lerner's granddaughter is actress Betsy Russell.

Works

Lerner's most influential book was America as a Civilization: Life and Thought in the United States Today (1957).

His book The Unfinished Country is a collection of more than 200 of his daily columns, which were written for the New York Post over the span of more than a decade. The Unfinished Country contains one of his better-known quotes: "The turning point in the process of growing up is when you discover the core of strength within you that survives all hurt." His 1990 book, Wrestling with the Angel, was about his long struggle with illness.

Bibliography 

 Books
 America as a Civilization: Life and Thought in the United States Today (1957)
 Volume 1: The Basic Frame
 Volume 2: Culture and Personality
 Values in Education: Notes Toward a Values Philosophy (1976) 
 Ted and the Kennedy Legacy: A Study in Character and Destiny (1980)
 Wrestling with the Angel: A Memoir of My Triumph Over Illness (1990) (memoir)

 undated books
 The Unfinished Country: A Book of American Symbols (collection of essays and editorials)
 Wounded Titans: American Presidents and the Perils of Power
 It Is Later Than You Think: The Need for a Militant Democracy 
 Nine Scorpions in a Bottle: Great Judges and Cases of the Supreme Court 
 Ideas Are Weapons: The History and Uses of Ideas 
 Magisterial Imagination: Six Masters of the Human Science
 Third World: Premises of U.S. Policy
 Ideas for the Ice Age: Studies in a Revolutionary Era
 Actions and Passions: Notes on the Multiple Revolutions of Our Time 
 "Education and a Radical Humanism: Notes Toward a Theory of the Educational Crisis" (with E.I.F. Williams) 
 Public Journal: Marginal Notes on Wartime America 
 Civil Liberties in War Times

 Edited works
 Encyclopaedia of the Social Sciences (1927-1932)
 The Nation (1936-1938)
 PM (1943-1948)
 Tocqueville and American Civilization 
 Thomas Jefferson: America's Philosopher-King
 The Mind and Faith of Justice Holmes: His Speeches, Essays, Letters, and Judicial Opinions 
 Essential Works of John Stuart Mill
 The Portable Veblen

 Forewords and introduction
 The Prince and The Discourses by Niccolò Machiavelli (New York: Random House, 1950)
 Values of Veblen, a critical appraisal by Bernard Rosenberg (Washington:  Public Affairs Press, 1956)
 Americans for Democratic Action: its role in national politics by Clifton Brock (Washington:  Public Affairs Press, 1962)
 Political science and political knowledge by Philip H. Melanson (Washington:  Public Affairs Press, 1975)

 Columnist and Editorial
 New York Post columnist

In popular culture 
Lerner was referenced in folk singer Phil Ochs' song, "Love Me, I'm a Liberal": "You know, I've memorized Lerner and Golden" (in reference also to Harry Golden).

See also

 The Nation 
 PM 
 New York Star (1948–1949)

References

External sources

 Max Lerner papers (MS 322). Manuscripts and Archives, Yale University Library.
 Romano, C. America the Philosophical (2012).
Richard Severo, Max Lerner, Writer, 89, Is Dead; Humanist on Political Barricades, The New York Times, June 6, 1992

1902 births
1992 deaths
American male journalists
20th-century American journalists
Washington University in St. Louis alumni
Sarah Lawrence College faculty
Harvard University faculty
Williams College faculty
Brandeis University faculty
Emigrants from the Russian Empire to the United States
Alliant International University
Jewish American writers
20th-century American writers
Jewish American journalists